Yalman is a Turkish name. Notable people with the surname include:
 Ahmet Emin Yalman (1888-1972), Turkish journalist
 Alp Yalman (born 1940), Turkish businessman
 Nur Yalman, Turkish social anthropologist
 Özlem Yalman, Turkish female FIBA-listed basketball referee

Turkish-language surnames